IATI may refer to:
Accounting Technicians Ireland, formerly the Institute of Accounting Technicians in Ireland (IATI)
International Aid Transparency Initiative
Israel Advanced Technology Industries